The hollowsnout grenadier (Coelorinchus caelorhincus), also called the blackspot grenadier, is a species of fish in the family Macrouridae.

The specific name derives from Greek κοῖλος (koilos, "hollow") and ῥύγχος (rhynchos, "snout").

Description

The hollowsnout grenadier is silvery in colour.

Habitat

Behaviour
The hollowsnout grenadier feeds on polychaetes, gastropods, cephalopods, crustaceans and fish.

References

Macrouridae
Fish described in 1810
Taxa named by Antoine Risso